The New York Bank Note Company was an engraver of stock certificates in New York City.

History
The company was founded in 1877 as the Kendall Bank Note Company. In 1892 George H. Kendall replaced Russell Sage as president of the company.

See also

American Bank Note Company
Homer Lee Bank Note Company

References

Banknote printing companies
1877 establishments in New York (state)
American companies established in 1877